Shaveh-ye Beyt Hamid (also Romanized as Shāveh-ye Beyt Ḩamīd; also known as Beyt-e Ḩamīd, Shāhebī, Shāveh-ye Ḩamīd, and Shobeybī) is a village in Moshrageh Rural District, Moshrageh District, Ramshir County, Khuzestan Province, Iran. At the 2006 census, its population was 124, in 26 families.

References 

Populated places in Ramshir County